Charles John Lockhart Rudd (12 March 1873 – 1 April 1950) was a Cape Colony-born English cricketer who played first-class cricket in one match in 1894 for Cambridge University. He was born in Cape Town, South Africa and died at Kingston-upon-Thames, Surrey, England. 

Rudd was the son of Charles Dunell Rudd, the associate of Cecil Rhodes and an extremely wealthy prospector and entrepreneur whose business fortune had dubiously legal foundations in pre-colonial South Africa. Charles John Lockhart Rudd, known as Jack, was educated at Harrow School and at Trinity College, Cambridge. He had some success in cricket at Harrow as a left-handed tail-end batsman and a left-handed fast bowler, taking seven wickets in the Eton v Harrow match of 1892. But at Cambridge University he was given only a single match, again batted at the tail-end, and failed to take a wicket in his six expensive overs. He did not play again.

Rudd graduated from Cambridge with a Bachelor of Arts degree in 1895; the directory of Cambridge alumni does not record any profession for him.

References

1873 births
1950 deaths
English cricketers
Cambridge University cricketers
Alumni of Trinity College, Cambridge
Cricketers from Cape Town
People educated at Harrow School
Emigrants from Cape Colony to the United Kingdom